Rod Lurie (born May 15, 1962) is an Israeli-American director, screenwriter, and former film critic.

Early life and career
The son of internationally syndicated cartoonist Ranan Lurie, he was born in Israel but moved to the United States at a young age, growing up in Greenwich, Connecticut, and Honolulu, Hawaii.

Graduating from the United States Military Academy at West Point in 1984, he served in the U.S. Army as an air defense artillery officer, then became an entertainment reporter and film critic, including stints at News12 in Norwalk, Connecticut, the New York Daily News, Premiere, Movieline, Entertainment Weekly, Los Angeles, and talk radio shows at KMPC and KABC, where his tactical on-air bets with Martin Landau, Mel Gibson and James Cameron that they would win the Oscar resulted in them having to pay up at the Academy Awards ceremony by publicly thanking him in their acceptance speeches.

As an investigative reporter in the entertainment industry, his discovery of unethical and illegal practices at tabloid newspapers gained him national exposure on programs such as 60 Minutes, Entertainment Tonight, Larry King Live, Nightline, and Geraldo. His irreverent style, however (he once described Danny DeVito as a "testicle with arms"), often raised controversy and got him banned from screenings.

In 1995, his book Once Upon a Time in Hollywood: Moviemaking, Con Games, and Murder in Glitter City, was published.

Film and TV career
Lurie's first foray into filmmaking, as writer and director, was the low-budget political thriller Deterrence (1999), with Kevin Pollak as the first Jewish President of the United States.

His second was The Contender (2000), starring Gary Oldman. It was written for Joan Allen and co-stars Jeff Bridges and Christian Slater. It was a critical success (76 percent positive on Rotten Tomatoes) and garnered Academy Award nominations for both Allen and Bridges.

His next directing effort, The Last Castle (2001) with Robert Redford and James Gandolfini, was a commercial failure; as was Line of Fire, his 2003–04 TV series about the FBI's office in Richmond, Virginia, which starred David Paymer as a mob boss.

Lurie then wrote and directed Nothing But the Truth, which is based on the stories of Valerie Plame and Judith Miller, which stars Kate Beckinsale, Matt Dillon, Angela Bassett, Alan Alda and David Schwimmer. Lurie insisted his film is not intended to be an accurate depiction of the Plame Affair, but merely a vehicle to explore a similar situation, which he then takes several steps further. "You look at the story that happened in reality, and Judy Miller gets some sort of permission to speak and then speaks. So what? Nothing really big came of the whole thing," explained Lurie in an interview published prior to the film's release. "I tried to make a movie that's a commercial thriller as well as being something that's topical."

Lurie worked on Resurrecting the Champ, a boxing drama, and served as creator and executive producer of the short-lived television series Commander in Chief, which starred Geena Davis as the United States' first female President, Mackenzie Allen. The show's high ratings plummeted after Lurie's departure from the show and its cancellation followed.

Lurie worked for ABC, but his contract, which was terminated during the writers' strike, was not renewed when it ended.

Lurie places tributes to his alma mater in his shows: Deterrence had an aide-de-camp to the President admitting he had to settle for the United States Air Force Academy because he couldn't get into West Point. Also, in The Contender, Bridges' president Evans can be seen wearing a West Point sweatshirt during the film.

The characters of President Jackson Evans (The Contender), prison inmate Lt. Gen. Eugene Irwin (The Last Castle), FBI agent Paige Van Doren (Line of Fire), and vice presidential nominee Gen. (ret.) Warren Keaton (Commander in Chief) are all fictional graduates of the "Long Gray Line".

Lurie also directed the remake of the home invasion thriller Straw Dogs. It received negative reviews from both audience viewers and critics, and did very poorly at the box office.

Lurie directed the 2020 war film The Outpost, based on the true story of the Battle of Kamdesh during the War in Afghanistan. The film received highly positive reviews, with significant praise for the battle sequences and depictions of the soldiers.

Personal life
Lurie lives in Los Angeles with his wife, author Kyra Davis and his stepson. He has two children, Hunter and Paige. Hunter died on July 2, 2018, aged 27 from a cardiac arrest.

Filmography

Feature films
Deterrence (1999) - director, writer, actor
The Contender (2000) - director, writer
The Last Castle (2001) - director
Resurrecting the Champ (2007) - director, producer, actor
Nothing but the Truth (2008) - director, writer, producer, actor
Straw Dogs (2011) - director, writer
The Outpost (2020) - director
The Senior (TBA) - director

Short films
The Nazi (2002) - director, writer

Television
Line of Fire (2003-2004) - director, writer, executive producer
Commander in Chief (2005-2006) - director, writer, executive producer
Hell on Wheels (2012-2015) - director
American Odyssey (2015) - director
Killing Reagan (2016) - director
Damnation (2017) - director

References

External links
 
 2009 interview with Bullz-Eye.com

1962 births
American film critics
American male screenwriters
American television directors
Israeli emigrants to the United States
Israeli Jews
Jewish American writers
Living people
People from Greater Los Angeles
Writers from Honolulu
United States Army officers
United States Military Academy alumni
Film directors from California
American male non-fiction writers
Film directors from Hawaii
Screenwriters from Hawaii
Screenwriters from California
21st-century American Jews